William Cornell Homestead is a historic home located in Butler Township, DeKalb County, Indiana.  The house was built about 1863, and is a two-story, "L"-shaped brick dwelling topped by an octagonal cupola. It features arched and porthole windows and sits on a cut fieldstone foundation.

It was added to the National Register of Historic Places in 1973.

References

Houses on the National Register of Historic Places in Indiana
Houses completed in 1863
Houses in DeKalb County, Indiana
National Register of Historic Places in DeKalb County, Indiana